David Charles Alcibiade (born 26 September 1991) is a French footballer who plays as a right back for US Saint-Malo.

after Lille OSC in young, in professional he went through FC Nantes and Marbella FC then he signed with IC Croix in January 2019.

References

External links

1991 births
Living people
Sportspeople from Créteil
French footballers
Association football defenders
Ligue 2 players
Ligue 1 players
Segunda División B players
Championnat National 2 players
Championnat National 3 players
FC Nantes players
Marbella FC players
US Saint-Malo players
French expatriate footballers
French expatriate sportspeople in Spain
Expatriate footballers in Spain
Iris Club de Croix players
Footballers from Val-de-Marne